O Gran Camiño (English: The Great Way), also known as Gran Camiño and the International Galician Tour, is a road cycling stage race held in the autonomous community of Galicia in northwestern Spain. The race is rated as a category 2.1 event on the UCI Europe Tour calendar.

The race returns regular professional cycling to Galicia for the first time since the Tour of Galicia, which was last held as a professional event in 2000; however, the two events are not related. The inaugural edition of the event took place in late February 2022 and consisted of four stages.

The name of the race draws inspiration from the Camino de Santiago pilgrimage to the cathedral of Santiago de Compostela in Galicia.

Winners

References 

UCI Europe Tour races
Cycle races in Spain
Recurring sporting events established in 2022
2022 establishments in Spain
Sport in Galicia (Spain)